This article lists programs broadcast by Mega Channel and on Mega Cosmos for international viewers from Greece:

Current programming

Note: Titles are listed according to their year of debut on the network in parentheses.

Dramas
I Gi tis Elias (2021)

Docuseries
Mega Stories with Dora Anagnostopoulou (2020)

Reality/non-scripted
Fos Sto Tounel with Aggeliki Nikolouli (1995)
Fishy with Giannis Tsimitselis (2021)

Game shows
Celebrity Game Night (2014)
The Chase with Maria Bekatorou (2021)

Talk shows
Eleni with Eleni Menegaki (2011)
Everything about our life with Michalis Kefalogiannis (2021)
Pame Danai with Danai Barka (2020)

Late night shows
Mega View with Niki Lyberaki (2021)

Specials
Spiti me to Mega (2020)

News and information
MEGA Central News (1989)
MEGA Afternoon News (1989)
MEGA Weekend (2005)
Koinonia Ora MEGA (2006)
Live News with Nikos Evagelatos (2020)
Mega Good Morning with Eleonora Meleti (2021)
Smile Again with Sissy Christidou (2021)

Sports
UEFA Champions League
Super Bala Live (2002)

Former programming

Soap operas

Series

Action/mystery
 Skorpios (Scorpio) 1994-1995 - starring and directed by Antonis Kafetzopoulos
 Peirasmos (Temptation) 1995-1996 - starring Stavros Zalmas
 Epifaneia (Surface) 2001-2002 - starring 
 Me Thea to Pelago (With View to the Sea) 2003-2004 - written by Elena Akrita and Giorgos Kyritsis
 Ihni (Traces) 2007-2008 - starring Giannis Zouganelis
Eglimata mistiriou (2020-2021)

Drama
 H Dipsa (Thirst) 1989-1991 - starring Giannis Voglis
 Spiti gia Pente (A House for Five) 1991-1992 - starring Karmem Rougeri
 Gynaikes (Women) 1992-1993 - written by Mirella Papaoikonomou
 Africa 1992-1993 - starring Nikos Sergianopoulos and Stavros Zalmas
 Oi Frouroi tis Achaeas (Achaea's Guards) 1992-1993 - starring Mimi Ntenisi and Stratos Tzortzoglou
 Anastasia 1993-1994 - written by Mirella Papaoikonomou
 Esu Apofasizeis (It's Your Decision) 1993-1996 - starring Giannis Vouros
 Mi Fovasai ti Fotia (Don't Be Afraid of the Fire) 1994-1995 - written by Mirella Papaoikonomou
 To Teleutaio Antio (The Last Goodbye) 1994-1995 - starring Giorgos Kimoulis and Kariofyllia Karampeti
 Apon (Absent) 1995-1996 - written by Mirella Papaoikonomou, starring Yannis Bezos
 Palirria (Tide) 1996-1997 - starring Nikos Sergianopoulos and Stratos Tzortzoglou
 Logo Timis (Due to my Honour) - written by Mirella Papaoikonomou
 Tzivaeri 1997-1998 - starring Vana Mparmpa
 Psithuroi Kardias (Whispers of the Hearts) 1997-1998 - Directed by Manousos Manousakis
 I Zoi Pou Den Ezisa (The Life I Didn't Lived) 1998-1999 - written by Mirella Papaoikonomou
 To Simadi tou Erota (Love's Sign) 1998-1999 - starring Vana Mparmpa and Stratos Tzortzoglou
 I Aithousa tou Thronou (Throne's Chamber) 1998-1999 - starring Alekos Alexandrakis
 Thumata Eirinis (Victims of Peace) 1998-1999 - starring Anna-Maria Papaharalambous
 O Megalos Thumos (The Big Anger) 1998-1999 - starring Gregoris Valtinos and Kariofyllia Karampeti
 Vendetta 1999-2000 - starring Giannis Fertis and Koralia Karanti
 Sti Skia tou Polemou (In War's Shadow) 1999-2000 - starring Mimi Ntenisi and Stratos Tzortzoglou
 H Zoi mas Mia Volta (Our Life is a Walk) 1999-2000 - starring Christoforos Papakaliatis and Fylareti Komninou
 Fugame (Let's Go) 1999-2000 - Directed by Nikos Koutelidakis
 Aerines Siopes (Silence in the Air) 2000-2003 - starring Marios Athanasiou, Katerina Papoutsaki and Panagiota Vlanti
 Na Me Proseheis (Take Care of Me) 2000-2001 - starring Konstantinos Markoulakis and Christoforos Papakaliatis
 Alma Libre (Free Soul) 2001-2002 - starring Nikos Sergianopoulos
 Fevga (Leave) 2002-2003 - starring Themis Mpazaka
 Kleise ta Matia (Close your Eyes) 2002-2004 - starring Pemu Zouni and Christoforos Papakaliatis
 Leni 2003-2004 - written by Mirella Papaoikonomou, starring Katia Dandoulaki
 Se Apostasi Anapnois (Too Close) 2003-2004 - starring Kostas Sommer and Maria Solomou
 Etsi Ksafnika (Suddenly) 2004-2005 - written by Mirella Papaoikonomou, starring Konstantinos Markoulakis
 Sto Fos tou Feggariou (Under the Moonlight) 2004-2005 - starring Lina Sakka
 Epafi (Contact) 2004-2005 - starring Nikos Sergianopoulos
 Metrao Stigmes (Counting Moments) 2004-2005 - starring Stavros Zalmas
 Gi kai Ouranos (Earth and Sky) 2005-2006 - starring Konstantinos Markoulakis
 Duo Meres Mono (Only Two Days) 2005-2007 - starring Christoforos Papakaliatis
 Oi Magisses tis Smyrnis (The Witches of Smyrna) 2005-2006 - starring Maria Kavogianni
 Mazi Sou (With You) 2006-2007 - starring Apostolos Totsikas
 Stous 31 Dromous (In the 31 Streets) 2007-2008 - starring Sofia Karvela
 Agria Paidia (Wild Kids) 2008-2009 - starring Antinoos Almpanis
 Xara Agnoeitai (Chara is Missing) 2008-2009 - starring Maria Kavogianni
 Koukles (Dolls) 2010-2011 - starring Lina Sakka and Dimitra Matsouka
 To Nisi (The Island) 2010-2011 - starring Katerina Lehou and Stelios Mainas

Soap operas
 Apagorevmeni Agapi (Forbidden Love) 1998-2006 - starring Marios Athanasiou
 Gia Mia Thesi ston Hlio (For a Place in the Sun) 1999-2002 - starring Petros Fyssoun
 Filodoksies (Ambitions) 2002-2006 - starring Giannis Vouros
 Vera Sto Dexi 2004-2007 - written by Elena Akrita and Giorgos Kyritsis, starring Katia Dandoulaki and Kostas Kazakos
 Maria, i Aschimi (Ugly Maria) 2006-2008 - Greek version of the Colombian TV series Yo soy Betty, la fea starring Aggeliki Daliani
 Komplicoj al la rekupero (Accomplices to the Rescue) 2007 - Greek version of the Mexican telenovela Cómplices Al Rescate
 Mia Stigmi, Duo Zoes (One Moment, Two Lives) 2007-2009 - starring Giannis Papazisis
Amoj plumbo (Amores Lead) 2008 - Greek version of the Mexican telenovela Amores, querer con alevosia
 Ta Mustika tis Edem (Eden's Secrets) 2008-2011 - written by Elena Akrita and Giorgos Kyritsis, starring Danis Katranidis
 H Zoi tis Allis (The Other Woman's Life) 2009-2012 - starring Katia Dandoulaki; Greek version of the Mexican telenovela Querida Enemiga
 Klemmena Oneira (Stolen Dreams) 2011–2015 - starring Alexandros Stavrou

Romantic comedies
 Ax Elen (Oh, Helen) 1992-1993 - starring Eleni Radou
 Love Sorry (1994-1995) - starring Tasos Chalkias
 Ntoltse Vita (Sweet Life) 1995-1996 - starring Anna Panayiotopoulou, Katiana Balanika and Maria Foka
 Dyo Ksenoi (Two Strangers) 1997-1999 - starring Nikos Sergianopoulos and Evelina Papoulia
 Eimaste ston Aera (We Are On Air) 1997-1999 - starring Thodoris Atheridis
 Kati Trexei Me Tous Dipla (There's Something Wrong with the Neighbors) 1999-2000 - starring Dimitra Matsouka
 Esu Ftais (It's Your Fault) 1999-2000 - starring Renia Louizidou
 Peri Anemon kai Ydaton (About Everything) 2000-2003 - starring Spyros Papadopoulos and Thanasis Veggos
 Eisai to Tairi mou (You Are My Love Mate) 2001-2002 - starring Vicky Stavropoulou and Alexis Georgoulis
 Fae ti Sokolata Sou (Eat Your Chocolate) 2003-2004 - starring Anna Panayiotopoulou and Nikos Sergianopoulos
 S1ngles 2004-2008 - starring Maria Solomou
 Kaneis de leei s' agapo (No One Says I Love You) 2004-2005 - starring Anna-Maria Papaharalambous, Giorgos Karamihos and Kostas Triantafyllopoulos
 Lakis o Glykoulis (The Adorable Lakis) 2008-2009 - starring Petros Filipidis

Comedies
 Oi Treis Harites (The Three Graces) 1990-1993 - starring Anna Panayiotopoulou, Nena Menti and Mina Adamaki
 Oi Aftheretoi 1990-1991 - starring Vasia Trifili
 Oi Aparadektoi (The Unacceptables) 1991-1993 - starring Spyros Papadopoulos, Dimitra Papadopoulou, Yannis Bezos and Vlassis Bonatsos
 Ekmek Pagoto (Ekmek Ice cream) 1991-1992 - starring Spyros Papadopoulos and Chrisoula Diavati
 H Eliza kai oi Alloi (Eliza and the Others) 1992-1993 - starring Mirka Papakonstantinou
 Kai oi Tesseris Itan Yperoxes (The Four Were Great) 1992-1995 - starring Maria Foka 
 Deka Mikroi Mitsoi 1992-2003 - starring Lakis Lazopoulos
 To Dis Eksamartin 1993-1996 - starring Nena Menti
 Rozalia 1993-1994 - starring Anna Panayiotopoulou
 O Ios tou Patera (The Father's Son) 1996-1998 - starring Tasos Chalkias
 O Kakos Vezuris 1997-1998 - starring Haris Romas
 Oi Andres Den Yparxoun Pia (Men Don't Exist Anymore) 1998-2000 - starring Katerina Lexou
 S'Agapo M'Agapas (I Love You, You Love Me) 2000-2002 - starring Dimitra Papadopoulou and Thodoris Atheridis
 Ti Psyhi Tha Paradoseis Mori? (What Soul Are You Going To Give To God, You Fool Woman) 2000-2001 - starring Eleni Radou
 Kapou Se Ksero (I Know You From Somewhere) 2001-2002 - starring Maria Kavogianni and Kaiti Konstantinou
 Savvatogennimenes (Born on Saturday) 2003-2004 - starring Eleni Radou
 Safe Sex: The TV Series 2005-2008 - a series based on the box office hit movie Safe Sex
 50-50 (Fifty-Fifty) 2005-2007 - starring Petros Filipidis, Pavlos Haikalis and Sakis Mpoulas
 Sto Para Pente (In the Nick of Time) 2005-2007 - starring Giorgos Kapoutzidis, Smaragda Karydi
 To Kokkino Domatio (The Red Room) 2005-2008 - written by Alexandros Rigas and Dimitris Apostolou
 Pali Apo Tin Arhi (Again From the Beginning) 2006-2007 - starring Memos Begnis and Anta Livitsanou
 Mavra Mesanyxta (Black Midnight) 2007-2009 - starring Stelios Mainas
 L.A.P.D. 2008-2010 - starring Ieroklis Mihailidis
 Ola ston Aera (Everything on Air) 2008-2009 - starring Maria Lekaki and Katiana Balanika
 H Genia Ton 592 Euro (The Generation of 592 Euro) 2010-2011 - starring Spyros Papadopoulos
 Me lene Vaggeli (Me lene Vaggeli) 2011-2012 - starring Vasilis Haralampopoulos
 Kliniki Periptwsi 2011-2012 - starring Yannis Bezos
 Me Ta Pantelonia Kato 2013-2014 - starring Ieroklis Mihailidis 
 Kato Partali 2014–2015 - starring Giannis Tsimitselis
Mia mera pano sti Gi (2020-2021)

Family comedies
 Patir, Ios kai Agio Pnevma (Father, Son and Holy Ghost) 1989-1990 - starring Spyros Papadopoulos
 To Retire 1990-1992 - starring Katerina Gioulaki
 Ta Epta Kaka tis Moiras Mou (The Seven Wrongs of My Fate) 1991-1994 - starring Giorgos Konstantinou
 Mana Einai Mono Mia (Mother is Only One) 1992-1994 - starring Mary Chronopoulou
 Oi Mikromessaioi (The Middle-class People) 1992-1993 - starring Martha Karagianni
 To Soi Mas (Our Family) 1992-1994 - starring Ntina Konsta
 Hi Rock 1992-1994 - starring Petros Filipidis and Tasos Chalkias
 Emeis ki Emeis (Just Us) 1994-1998 - starring Eleni Gerasimidou
 O Petros kai ta Koritsia tou (Peter and his Girls) 1994-1996 - starring Petros Filipidis
 Kare tis Ntamas 1997-1999 - starring Joyce Evidi
 Me Dyo Mamades (With Two Mothers) 1998-1999 - starring Nena Menti and Chrysa Ropa
 Deka Lepta Kirigma (Ten Minutes Preaching) 2000-2004 - starring Dimitris Kouroumpalis
 Epta Thanasimes Petheres (Seven Deadly Mothers-in-Law) 2003-2010 - starring Vicky Stavropoulou
 I Ntanta (The Nanny) 2003-2005 - Greek version of the American sitcom The Nanny, starring Maria Lekaki
 I Ora I Kali (2004-2007) - starring Panos Mixalopoulos
 Eftyhismenoi Mazi (Happy Together) 2007-2009 - starring Yannis Bezos
 Latremenoi mou Geitones (My Lovely Neighbors) 2007-2009 - starring Kostas Koklas
 I Polykatoikia (The Block of Flats) 2008-2011 - starring Pavlos Haikalis
Paidiki Hara (Playground) 2009-2010 - Kostas Koklas, Renia Louizidou, Giorgos Alevizakis, Giannis Kyrikos and Vasilis Galaios.
 Piso sto spiti 2011-2013 - starring Maria Kavogianni
 To Spiti tis Emmas 2013-2014- starring Yannis Bezos-Katia Dandoulaki
 Monterna Oikogeneia 2014–2015 - starring Antonis Kafetzopoulos
 Mana X Ouranou 2014–2015- starring Maria Solomou

Shows

Various shows
 Mega Star 1989-2010 and 2020-2021- a music show presenting the most popular songs in Greece
1989-1990 hosted by Arianna Dimitropoulou
1990-1991 hosted by Rika Vagiani and Nikos Diamantaropoulos
1992-2004 hosted by Natalia Germanou
2004-2005 hosted by Betty Maggira
2005-2007 hosted by Evi Adam
2007-2008 hosted by Ioanna Kanellopoulou
2008-2010 hosted by Katerina Stikoudi
2020-2021 hosted by Mando Gasteratou  and DJ Antonis Dimitriades 
 Disney Club 1994-2002 - Greek version of the popular children's show 
 Traction 1998–2011 - a show about cars and motorcycles hosted by Kostas Stefanis
 Stin Kouzina Olotaxws 2000-2004 - a show about cooking hosted by Ilias Mamalakis 
 Rantevou gia Cinema 2000-2009 - a show about cinema presenting the new releases in a weekly basis hosted by Orestis Andreadakis
 Ta Mustika tis Vefas 2003-2004 - a cooking show hosted by Vefa Alexiadou  
 Mpoukia kai Sugxwrio 2003-2008 - a cooking show hosted by Ilias Mamalakis traveling around Greece, finding traditional recipes
 Megalicious Chart Live 2005-2006 - countdown of top music charts and live performances of Greek stars hosted by Themis Georgantas
 Extreme Makeover 2008-2009 - the Greek version of the American show, hosted by Zeta Douka
 Glykies Alximies 2008-2010 - a cooking show hosted by Stelios Parliaros focusing on pastry
 Food and the City 2010-2011 - a cooking show hosted by Vasilis Kallidis

Morning shows
 Xamogelate Einai Metadotiko 1993-1995 hosted by Andreas Mikroutsikos
 Metaxi Mas 1995-1998 hosted by Sofia Vossou and Elnta Panopoulou
 San Sto Spiti Sas 1999-2003 hosted by Fotis Sergoulopoulos and Maria Mpakodimou
 Omorfos Kosmos To Prwi 2003-2010
2003-2009 hosted by Grigoris Arnaoutoglou
2009-2010 hosted by Nikos Papadakis
 Proino Mou 2010–2014
2010–2013 hosted by Giorgos Liagkas and Fei Skorda
2013–2014 hosted by Petros Kostopoulos and Jenny Balatsinou

Game shows
 Tilemplofes 1989 (Revival of the Greek version of Break the Bank) hosted by Vasilis Tsivilikas
 Kontres 1991-1995 (original Greek version of Family Feud) hosted by Vlassis Bonatsos
 Rantevou sta Tyfla 1991-1998
1991-1996 hosted by Vasia Trifili
1996-1998 hosted by Isavella Vlasiadou
 Mega Banca Show 1992-1995 (Greek version of Bob's Full House / Trump Card) hosted by Giorgos Polixroniou
 To Megalo Pazari 1992-1995 (Greek version of Let's Make a Deal) hosted by Andreas Mikroutsikos
 Rouk Zouk 1994-1997 (Greek version of Bruce Forsyth's Hot Streak / Ruck Zuck) hosted by Mary Miliaresi
 Risko 1995-1997 (Greek version of Wipeout) hosted by Giorgos Polixroniou
 H Agora tou Aiona 1997 (Greek revival of Sale of the Century) hosted by Mary Miliaresi
 Kontra Plake 1995-1999 (revived/remade Greek version of Family Feud) hosted by Spyros Papadopoulos
 Vres ti Frasi 1998-2001 (Greek version of Catch Phrase) 
1998-2000 hosted by Miltos Makridis
2000-2001 hosted by Joyce Evidi
 Poios Thelei Na Ginei Ekatommyriouxos 1999-2002 (Greek version of Who Wants To Be A Millionaire) hosted by Spyros Papadopoulos
 O Pio Adunamos Krikos 1999-2002 (Greek version of The Weakest Link) hosted by Elena Akrita
 Taxi Girl 2006-2010 (Greek Version of Cash Cab) hosted by Vicky Stavropoulou
 Eisodimatias 2007-2009 hosted by Grigoris Arnaoutoglou
 Power of 10 2008-2009 (Greek version of the American game show of the same name) hosted by Konstantinos Markoulakis
 H Ekdikisi tis Ksanthias 2008-2009 hosted by Giorgos Liagas
 Fifty Fifty 2010-2011 hosted by Giorgos Liagas
 Money Drop 2010-2011 (Greek version of the British game show The Million Pound Drop) hosted by Grigoris Arnaoutoglou
 1,000,000 yien 2020-2021 (Gameshow, hosted by Smaragda Karidi)

Entertainment
 Akouna Matata 1998-1999 hosted by Christos Ferentinos, who travels around Greece talking to the local people
 Omorfos Kosmos 2002-2003 hosted by Grigoris Arnaoutoglou; the show has the same concept as Ferentinos' show Akouna Matata
 Backstage 2003-2006 - news and information about the world of show biz. Features the latest from TV, movies, music, fashion, nightlife and more hosted by Giorgos Satsidis
 I Love TV 2004-2006 - a variety show with guests from all avenues of entertainment, from singers to dancers to athletes to actors, hosted by Fotis Sergoulopoulos and Maria Mpakodimou
 Prive 2004-2006 - a talk show featuring interviews with famous stars hosted by Elena Katritsi
 Oi Kipouroi tou Mega 2010-2011 - a show hosted by Makis Tsokas, Giannis Panayiotopoulos and Sotiris Vrettos about gardening

Reality/talent shows
 Na I Eukairia 1989-2003 - talent show
1989-1990 hosted by Sofia Aliberti
2001-2002 hosted by Eva Kotanidi
2002-2003 hosted by Aleka Kamila
 Bar 2001-2002 - reality show hosted by Miltos Makridis
 Popstars 2002-2003 - Greek version of the talent show
 H Farma 2002-2004 - reality show
2002-2003 hosted by Grigoris Arnaoutoglou
2003-2004 hosted by Hlias Valasis
 Party 2003-2004 - reality show hosted by Katerina Laspa
 Super Idol 2003-2004 - Greek version of the talent show Pop Idol, hosted by Themis Georgantas
 Survivor 2002-2007 - Greek version of the famous reality show 
2002-2004 hosted by Grigoris Arnaoutoglou
2006-2007 hosted by Konstantinos Markoulakis
 So You Think You Can Dance 2006-2008 - Greek version of the talent show hosted by Vicky Kaya
 MasterChef Greece 2010-2012 - Greek version of the cooking show
 2010-2011 hosted by Eugenia Manolidou
2011-2012 hosted by Mary Sinatsaki
 Just the Two of Us 2010-2011 and 2013-2014 - Greek version of the reality singing contest hosted by Giorgos Kapoutzidis
 Junior MasterChef Greece 2011-2012 - Greek version of the cooking show hosted by Maria Bekatorou

Night shows
 Alla Kolpa 1994-1996 hosted by Vlassis Bonatsos
 Bravo 1994-2000 hosted by Roula Koromila
 Oti Kalutero 1998-2000 hosted by Anna Drouza
 Apo Stoma Se Stoma 2003-2004 hosted by Fotis Sergoulopoulos and Maria Mpakodimou
 Zo Ena Drama 2004-2005 hosted by Takis Zaharatos
 Poly tin Kyriaki 2005-2007 hosted by Grigoris Arnaouroglou
2005-2006 co-hosted by Marietta Chrousala
2006-2007 co-hosted by Kalomoira
Sto spiti me to Mega (We stay at home) (March 2020-2022)

Sports 

 Coppa Italia (final only in 2019–20)
 FA Cup (from quarter finals in 2019–20)
 Taça de Portugal (final only in 2019–20)
UEFA Champions League (2021-2024)
UEFA Super Cup (2021-2024)

Comedy    
Cheers
Full House 
Home Improvement  
I Dream of Jeannie
The Muppet Show 
The Nanny
Roseanne

Children's/animated    
101 Dalmatians: The Series  
The Adventures of Tintin
AladdinBonkers      Buzz Lightyear of Star Command Doug    Extreme Ghostbusters Godzilla: The Series Honey, I Shrunk the Kids: The TV Show  Jackie Chan Adventures   Kidd Video  Max Steel     My Little Pony      Rurouni Kenshin     Saban's Adventures of the Little Mermaid   Samurai Pizza Cats    Teen Angel Returns The New Adventures of Winnie the Pooh  The Real GhostbustersThe SmurfsThe Spectacular Spider-Man   The WeekendersTimon & PumbaaTiny Toon Adventures Drama/mystery  DallasDynastyGeneral Hospital Santa Barbara''

See also
Mega Channel

References

External links

Mega Channel
Mega Channel